"Following the Sun" is a song by the British production team Red Triangle, under their Super-Hi band name, and Neeka, a duo featuring Katy Tiz, the sister of Red Triangle's George Tizzard.

The song was originally released on 2 October 2020, with remixes released across 2021. Neeka said "We wrote 'Following the Sun' with one ambition: to make people happy. If we can bring some light and positivity to the world right now, then we have succeeded."

Track listing

Personnel
Super-Hi
 George Tizzard and Rick Parkhouse 

Neeka
 Negin Djafari and Katy Tizzard

Charts

Weekly charts

Year-end charts

References

2020 singles
2020 songs
Songs written by George Tizzard
Songs written by Rick Parkhouse
Songs written by Negin Djafari